The Rhodesian Armoured Corps, nicknamed the "Black Devils" — was the only standing armoured battalion of the Rhodesian Security Forces. During World War II, it took part in the Allied Spring 1945 offensive and the Battle of Monte Cassino as part of South Africa's 6th Armoured Division. The unit was among the first to enter a liberated Florence in July 1944. Prior to 1963, its crews were trained in the United Kingdom or Aden Colony and were known as the "Selous Scouts" under the Federation of Rhodesia and Nyasaland. After Rhodesia's Unilateral Declaration of Independence, maintaining the armoured vehicle fleet became a responsibility of the Rhodesian Light Infantry until Major Bruce Rooken-Smith reactivated the former Rhodesian Armoured Car Regiment in 1972. During the Rhodesian Bush War, the regiment fought in several major campaigns and battles, particularly Operation Miracle in September 1979. It was superseded by the new Zimbabwe Armoured Corps between 1980 and 1981.

History

World War II

Shortly after the outbreak of World War II, colonial authorities in Southern Rhodesia began looking to raise a mechanised unit for the British Empire's ongoing war effort and established specialist training areas at Umtali accordingly. The resulting Southern Rhodesian Reconnaissance Unit was created in February 1941 and an intake of potential recruits from the Rhodesia Regiment accepted the following year. A stylised sable head was chosen as the unit symbol, along with the motto  Ase Sabi Luto – "We fear nothing" – later adopted as Asesabi Lutho in the Sindebele language. November 1942 saw the SRRU formally renamed the "Southern Rhodesian Reconnaissance Regiment" and the first intake's redeployment to Pietermaritzburg, South Africa. Due to the regiment's exceptionally small numbers, it was swiftly integrated with the South African 6th Armoured Division.

The 6th Armoured arrived in Egypt in mid-1943, too late to participate in the recent Tunisia Campaign. Major General Evered Poole, the division commander, was free to focus on routine exercises, desert training, and integration of his Southern Rhodesian personnel. Despite being entitled to wear the flashes and insignia of the South African Army, most Rhodesians also opted to retain their regimental lapels. Desert exercises on M4 Sherman tanks were carried out with the assistance of Britain's III Corps from December 1943 to January 1944. Although already briefed on their pending reassignment to Palestine, in April 1944 Poole's forces were unexpectedly shipped to Italy. The Rhodesians saw action with the Pretoria Regiment and C Squadron, 1 Special Service Battalion during maneuvers by I Canadian Corps along the Winter Line. Their first solo engagement with Wehrmacht contingents after the fall of Rome occurred near Paliano on 3 June. A particularly vicious battle was fought against Tiger I tanks of the 352nd Division six days later, in which Rhodesian Sherman crews played a prominent part.

In recognition of their close association and service with the British 24th Guards Brigade during the Italian Campaign, the regiment was permitted to wear the colours of the Brigade of Guards at a farewell parade in March 1945.

Interwar period

In December 1948 the Southern Rhodesian Reconnaissance Regiment was reestablished as the Southern Rhodesian Armoured Car Regiment. Aside from a few Marmon Herringtons retained from wartime association with South Africa, 20 American T17E1 Staghounds – distinguished in Commonwealth service as the Staghound – were acquired. The Staghound was also of World War II vintage but remained ideally suited to local conflicts. It was swift, with a road speed hovering near ninety kilometres per hour, an excellent range of nearly eight hundred kilometres on one tank of fuel, and enough protection to withstand punishment from virtually all small arms. Directed by Lieutenant Colonel C.V. King, the regiment continued to undergo peace-time training but was largely inactive throughout the 1950s. In 1961, the Federation of Rhodesia and Nyasaland initiated a thorough reorganisation of the armed forces, and Southern Rhodesian Armoured Cars was reduced to a single squadron. Unit personnel initially shared a base with the Rhodesian Light Infantry near Bulawayo before being deployed to Ndola under the command of a Major P.F. Miller, where they remained throughout the Congo Crisis. During this period regimental colours in cerise and old gold were adopted, commemorating a longstanding affiliation with the 11th Hussars.

In December 1963 the federation was abolished and A Squadron disbanded, its assets evenly divided between the two larger successor states. 28 Daimler Ferret scout cars were handed to Northern Rhodesia and later inherited by Zambia at independence. At least 10 Ferrets as well as all the remaining Staghounds were retained by Southern Rhodesia.

Southern Rhodesian armour spent two years in deep storage before 1 Reconnaissance Troop, Rhodesian Light Infantry, requested some Staghounds for "interest training". The armoured cars had already been marked for scrap, but days prior to Ian Smith's Unilateral Declaration of Independence the notion was revisited and reconnaissance men summoned for training on the Staghounds. The RLI encountered severe difficulty in locating trained drivers – to say nothing of servicing their condemned vehicles, which had already been stripped of all salvageable crew equipment. Two were restored and driven under their own power to Kariba on 10 November 1965 to arrest possible incursions by Zambian troops. A few hours before UDI security forces began fortifying the airstrip, intending to deny it by force to incoming Royal Air Force Javelins. It was decided to salute the occasion by firing a symbolic 37mm round towards Zambia. Twelve solid shot armour-piercing shells were drawn, six to each working Staghound. Only one car fired successfully, destroying its elderly breech protector in the process. Both were returned to the Rhodesian Army motor pool in early 1966.

Rhodesian Bush War

The unit's CO from inception to 1977 was Major Rooken Smith, and from 1978 was American Major Darrell Winkler. He was a field grade officer in the U.S. Army, who, after resignation went to South Africa first, and then towards Rhodesia. He was commissioned in the Rhodesian Army on 12 August 1977. The Rhodesian Armoured Corps then consisted of four squadrons, three of them were manned by territorials and only one squadron with a regular staff supplemented by National Servicemen.

An Armoured Depot was established at Blakiston-Houston Barracks which conducted all armour training and housed the Headquarters, Stores, Signals and Workshop detachments adjacent to King George VI Barracks (Army HQ) on the outskirts of Salisbury. Their vehicles consisted of the Rolls-Royce powered Ferret Scout Car, housing a 7.62mm Browning machine-gun in a small hatch-topped turret and the GM-powered Eland Armoured Car, the South African-produced version on the French Panhard AML-90, equipped with a 90mm cannon and a co-axial 7.62mm Browning machine-gun in a fully enclosed revolving turret. Later on the regiment received from South Africa eight captured T-55 main battle tanks, armed with a 100mm main cannon, a 7.62mm co-axial machine-gun and a 12.75mm anti aircraft gun.

They were fighting a counterinsurgency war for the most part but also continually trained for classical warfare in order to deal with enemies in neighbouring states who were equipped with T-34, T-55 and T-62 tanks,  supported by Soviet, Red Chinese and Eastern European advisers. Heavy weapons deployed against the RhACR during border battles included 122mm rocket launchers, 75mm recoilless rifles and 82mm mortars. The TM46 anti-tank mine, often boosted, accounted for most of the regiment's casualties in the internal insurgency conflict.

The regiment took part in a number of static but intense battles, notably at Mount Selinda against the Mozambican Army (where a Bronze Cross was awarded to 2nd Lieutenant Rae) in 1977 and at Chirundu in October 1978, where heavy-machine gun, artillery and mortar duels took place between D Squadron and elements of the Zambian Army over a period of three days and nights near the Otto Beit Bridge. Elements of the RDR were also involved at close quarters at the bridge, while 1RR provided 81mm mortar and 106mm recoilless rifle fire support.

In July 1977 D Squadron engaged a large group of ZANLA guerrillas north of Vila Salazar, while they were attempting to cross the border into Rhodesia, and it was reported that 37 enemy were killed in that engagement with some accounted for at point-blank range. In these battles the Eland and its devastating 90mm round were decisive in the outcome.  Nobody was hurt on the Rhodesian side in any of these engagements. Casualties in the regiment were among the lowest in the army because the guerrilla enemy avoided contact as far as possible.

In August 1979, at Hippo Creek north west of Victoria Falls, a single vehicle from troop Tango 22, D Squadron engaged a group of ZIPRA guerrillas attempting a night-time crossing of the border into Rhodesia. Enemy forces covering the crossing, and others waiting to cross, returned fire with mortars, armour piercing 12.75’s and small arms. Despite the initial contact lasting less than two minutes, the crossing was foiled, and 28 enemy bodies were subsequently recovered in mop-up operations on the Rhodesian side of the river in Hippo Creek. Between T22’s return fire and the artillery and mortar fire missions called in by the vehicle commander, 2nd Lieutenant Erasmus, a further 90 plus ZIPRA Guerrillas from Zebra Battalion were accounted for on the Zambian side of the river. This engagement was described by Colonel Ron Reid-Daly, in his book Top Secret War, as the most successful, wholly land based, contact of the bush war. No Rhodesian casualties were sustained in this engagement.

Adoption of T-55 tanks

In October 1979, South African port authorities boarded and seized a French freighter, the Astor, believed to be carrying a shipment of weaponry bound for Angola. The Astor had initially been chartered by the Libyan government with the delivery of arms, primarily ten T-55LD tanks of Polish origin from Tripoli's surplus stocks, to Uganda. The tanks, including assorted ammunition and spare parts, were to be offloaded at Mombasa, Kenya, and from thence transported overland. By October the Astor'''s crew had already rounded the Cape of Good Hope but received belated news of Uganda's defeat in the Uganda–Tanzania War, and new orders to reroute their cargo to an unknown Angolan port. The freighter abruptly changed course; upon its unexpected return to South African waters which aroused suspicion, the Astor was impounded in Durban.

South Africa confiscated all ten T-55s under the pretext that she was effectively at war with Angola at the time, retaining two for evaluation purposes. The remaining eight were offered as aid to the Rhodesian Army, which assigned them to a newly raised "E" Squadron, Rhodesian Armoured Corps. It was intentionally leaked to the press that the tanks had been captured in Mozambique.  For several months the T-55s were driven around the country on transporters, giving the impression that Rhodesia possessed a much larger number. Personnel assigned to "E" Squadron were trained by South African tank crews, who also modified each T-55 with an improved communications system adopted from the Eland Mk7 and refinished with anti-infrared paint. Radios were eventually removed from the loader's position and reinstalled near the vehicle commander.

The first intake of T-55 crews were recruited only from Rhodesian Army regulars and assigned to a Bundeswehr veteran, Captain Rolf Kaufeld, who was well versed in tank warfare. Despite their deployment in anticipation of potential ceasefire violations during Rhodesia's general elections in 1980, the tanks remained untested in combat.

Structure

Patterned after its British and South African counterparts, the Rhodesian Armoured Corps was generally organised along NATO lines. There were five squadrons (companies); each squadron had four troops – including attached signals, training, maintenance, and headquarters personnel. In 1979, a fifth troop – support infantry – was added. Due to the size of the Rhodesian Army and its reserve-dependent status, three of the squadrons were manned by reservists and only active for incremental periods. The fourth squadron was permanently staffed by a rotating cadre of regular officers and national servicemen.

All squadrons could muster over 300 members for active duty. At one time, RhACR's ranks swelled to 500 troops in five squadrons, including 60 South African-built Eland armoured cars, 50 unlicensed copies of German UR-416 personnel carriers, 20 British-built Daimler Ferret scout cars, and an array of locally produced improvised fighting vehicles. After 1979 the inventory included the 8 Polish-built Soviet T-55LD tanks mentioned above. 

In the 1960s preeminent armoured vehicle of the period was the Ferret, a pre-independence contribution from the British Forces Aden. Although 30 Ferrets had once been maintained by the Southern Rhodesian Armoured Regiment some of these were passed on to other successor states after the breakup of the Federation. The Rhodesian Light Infantry received 10 examples in varying states of disrepair and was forced to restore them. Even American-made T17E1 Staghounds of World War II vintage were saved from pending scrapping, and employed as fixed installations when no longer reliably mobile.

RhACR's stratagems reflected the regiment's experience on Humber and Marmon-Herrington armoured cars during the North Africa Campaign, as well as the training many Rhodesian crews had received from their British instructors during the Aden Emergency. However, as the Rhodesian Bush War intensified, Salisbury adopted elements of Israeli mechanised doctrine – particularly those which emphasised light cavalry movements behind enemy lines. RhACR tactics came to revolve around mobility, speed, and swift aggression.

Although maligned by age and further deteriorating as a result of hard use and the difficulty in obtaining spares from the United Kingdom, Ferrets continued to be employed for counter-insurgency operations and protective duties.Folk song by John Edmond about a Ferret named George, https://www.youtube.com/watch?v=Ys2xk5Ca7Lk Accessed 29 August 2022 Equipped with a single heavy machine gun, Browning medium machine guns, or a 20mm Hispano-Suiza HS.820 anti-aircraft gun, they were retrofitted with new motors and larger fuel tanks. RhACR units also used MAP-45 and MAP-75 armoured personnel carriers, which, although lightly armed and armoured, provided excellent protection for their embarked infantry sections against land mines. Local manufacturers either converted an older chassis into a MAP or created an entirely new one, installing engines stripped from a menagerie of imported commercial vehicles.

In 1976 rumours of T-34 and T-54 tanks in neighbouring Mozambique – where the Rhodesian security forces were increasingly being drawn into external operations against Robert Mugabe's Zimbabwe African National Liberation Army (ZANLA), caused a stir, prompting the formation of tank-killer teams. Infantrymen were trained in the use of ageing M20 bazookas while the artillery corps rigged M40 recoilless rifles to Unimog trucks for engaging heavy armour. The Unimog crews worked in pairs to counter the likelihood of retaliatory fire, due in part to the M40's backblast which served to highlight the gunner's position. As the Ferret's firepower was limited, Eland Mk4 armoured cars were also imported in quantity. A South African variant of the French Panhard AML, the Eland was frequently utilised for fire support and anti-tank duties. It was armed with a 90mm cannon capable of destroying a T-34 at medium range, enabling the smaller armoured cars to punch well above their weight during conventional engagements.

The Rhodesians favoured wheeled, lightly protected, vehicles like the Ferret, Eland, and MAP series of personnel carriers because of their operational range and simplicity. Nearly all the RhACR's support vehicles deployed during the war shared these characteristics, including the ubiquitous Mine Protected Combat Vehicle. The limited exception were Rhodesia's T-55s, which were never deployed operationally. After 1976 insurgent and allied forces in Zambia and Mozambique fielded T-54/55 and T-34 MBTs, BRDM-1 and BRDM-2 reconnaissance vehicles, and BTR-152 and BTR-60 APCs. These often boasted heavier armour, more lethal main armament, better armour-piercing ammunition, and better fire control than the Eland and other assorted vehicles pressed into anti-tank duty by the regiment. RhACR recognised this threat by restructuring itself for conventional warfare accordingly and joining with the Rhodesian African Rifles in 1980 to create its first combined arms battalion.

Orders of dress
The regiment was allegedly given the nickname 'The Black Devils' by the insurgents, reflecting the black tank-suits and leather jackets worn by some of the more highly spirited D Squadron members. These were introduced by Darryl Winkler in an effort to engender an esprit de corps within his squadron – and echoed the all-black look of the British Royal Tank Regiment.

In the operational area the majority of the soldiers of the regiment wore one-piece tank uniforms and peaked field caps with neck flaps. On base, standard Rhodesian camouflage was worn with a black beret, fitted with the sable badge illustrated on this page. 'T' Troop wore the Corps of Signals badge. The fitter section wore the Army Service Corps badge. All badges were underpinned by the Cerise and Old Gold regimental colours on an enameled plaque. The stable belt's colours were, according to former commanding officer Lt Col Rooken-Smith: "Cerise and Old Gold, to mark the affiliation with [the British Army] 11th hussars, hence [also] the brooch below [the beret] badge".

See also
Rhodesian Bush War
Rhodesian Security Forces
Weapons of the Rhodesian Bush War

References

Further reading
 Peter Gerard Locke & Peter David Farquharson Cooke, Fighting Vehicles and Weapons of Rhodesia 1965–80, P&P Publishing, Wellington 1995 
 Robert K.Brown, The Black Devils'', Soldier of Fortune Magazine, January 1979

External links
Rhodesian Armoured Corps

Armored regiments
Armoured Corps
Armoured Cars
Military units and formations established in 1941
Military units and formations disestablished in 1956
Military units and formations established in 1972
Military units and formations disestablished in 1980
Armoured Corps